White Rabbit Project is a Netflix series starring Kari Byron, Tory Belleci, and Grant Imahara, the build team from MythBusters, that was released on December 9, 2016.  According to the official synopsis, the team investigates topics such as "jailbreaks, superpower technology, heists, and crazy World War II weapons", which they will explore through experiments, builds, and tests. Despite a positive reception, the series was cancelled by Netflix after one season.

Production 
The show was first announced at DragonCon 2016. The show is produced by John Luscombe, Ryan Senter, and Martyn Ives, who are from Beyond Productions, the production company for Mythbusters. A trailer was released for the series on November 29, 2016.

Episodes

References

External links 
 
 

2016 American television series debuts
2016 American television series endings
English-language Netflix original programming
Netflix original documentary television series
MythBusters
Television series by Beyond Television Productions
Television series featuring reenactments